Major-General Robert Knox Ross  (23 August 1893 – 3 November 1951) was a senior British Army officer who, during World War II, commanded the 53rd (Welsh) Infantry Division throughout the campaign in North-West Europe from June 1944 until May 1945.

Early life and military career
Robert Knox Ross was born on 23 August 1893, the son of a British Army officer, Brigadier-General Robert James Ross of the Middlesex Regiment, he was educated at Cheltenham College and the Royal Military College, Sandhurst. He graduated from Sandhurst and was commissioned as a second lieutenant into the Queen's (Royal West Surrey Regiment), the second most senior line infantry regiment of the British Army, on 5 February 1913. He served with the 2nd Battalion, Queen's in South Africa and Bermuda.

On the outbreak of World War I, in August 1914, the battalion, stationed in Pretoria, was sent to England, arriving there in September, where it became part of the 22nd Brigade of the 7th Division. On 22 September Ross was promoted to lieutenant. The battalion was sent to the Western Front in October and Ross, commanding a platoon in 'A' Company, with his battalion, fought in the First Battle of Ypres, where he was one of the few officers not killed or wounded. On 22 October 1915, he was promoted to captain. Ross remained on the Western Front until 1916, upon promotion to the staff and becoming brigade major of the 27th Brigade, and later the 233rd Brigade in Palestine in the Middle Eastern theatre. In 1916 he became a General staff Officer Grade 2 (GSO2) with the 60th (2/2nd London) Division, part of the Egyptian Expeditionary Force (EEF). He ended the war in 1918 having been awarded the Distinguished Service Order (DSO), on 1 January 1918, Military Cross (MC), and was thrice mentioned in despatches.

Between the wars
Remaining in the British Army during the interwar period, he served as adjutant of the 2nd Battalion, Queen's Royal Regiment in India from 14 May 1919 until September 1923. He was seconded to the Egyptian Army and the Sudan Defence Force (SDF) for almost a decade, from 21 September 1923 until 1932. He married Kathleen Ogden in 1933 and, in 1937, he was promoted to lieutenant colonel and assumed command of the 2nd Battalion of his regiment, then serving in Palestine during the Arab revolt, for which he was awarded his fourth mention in despatches. While there he first met Major General Bernard Montgomery, General Officer Commanding (GOC) of the 8th Division, of which the 2nd Queen's formed part of, serving in the 14th Brigade. Unlike many others who later became senior commanders, Ross did not attend the staff colleges at either Camberley or Quetta. He was mentioned in despatches for his services in Palestine in September 1939.

World War II
Still serving in Palestine upon the outbreak of World War II, the battalion moved, in January 1940, to Brigadier Cyril Lomax's 16th Brigade. In April he returned to the United Kingdom and, on 24 April, was promoted to the acting rank of brigadier, and took command of the 160th Infantry Brigade, a Territorial Army (TA) formation then serving in Northern Ireland with its parent unit, the 53rd (Welsh) Infantry Division, then commanded by Major General Bevil Wilson. On 12 September 1942, promoted to acting major general, he became the GOC of the 53rd Division, succeeding Major General Gerard Bucknall. His rank of major general was made temporary on 12 September 1943, and permanent on 12 December 1944 (with seniority backdated to 3 February 1944)

He trained the division in England for the next 21 months, leading it with great success during Operation Overlord, codename for the Allied invasion of Normandy, in the summer of 1944. His 53rd Division sustained heavy casualties in the Battle for Caen and the battles that followed, but by the end of the campaign in Normandy had captured some 3,500 German troops as prisoners of war (POWs). The division then, in the aftermath of the Battle of Falaise (where Captain Tasker Watkins of the 1/5th Battalion, Welch Regiment was awarded the division's only Victoria Cross of the war), took part in the pursuit of the retreating German forces during the Allied advance from Paris to the Rhine, entering the Netherlands and playing a relatively minor role in Operation Market Garden, capturing the town of 's-Hertogenbosch, later being one of the few British divisions to play a part in the Battle of the Bulge. In February 1945 the division played a significant role in Operation Veritable (Battle of the Reichswald), later crossing the River Rhine in March and taking part in the Western Allied invasion of Germany, eventually ending the war in Hamburg in May. He continued to command the division in the Allied occupation of Germany. Ross was made a Companion of the Order of the Bath (CB) on 1 February 1945.

Postwar years
For his services in North-West Europe he was awarded the Companion of the Order of the Bath in 1945, along with the French Legion of Honour and the Croix de guerre, the latter two in 1944. In November 1945, after three years as GOC, he relinquished command of the 53rd Division. The division historian described "the departure of General Ross" as a "sad event." Ross "had been associated with the Division since May 1940, first as Commander of the 160th Brigade, and from September 1942 as Divisional Commander. He was one of the few who held the same command from the time of the early fighting in Normandy until the German surrender. The uninterrupted successes of the Division during nearly a year of continuous fighting were the measures of the qualities of this fine officer." He then commanded the Aldershot and Hampshire District in Southeast England before his retirement from the British Army in December 1946. He died suddenly on 3 November 1951, at the age of 58.

Personality
Despite being not nearly as well known as other senior British commanders, General Sir Charles Harington, then CO of the 1st Battalion, Manchester Regiment, who later became GSO1, claimed Ross was "popular with everyone" and a "Father figure to the troops." H. C. Kenway, then a junior staff officer, described Ross as "confident and impressive and greatly respected as a commander", although he "was not charismatic like many other generals and was rather reserved and introspective by nature. In my experience he was always courteous, never overbearing and never tried to impress as a great 'character' like a Monty, a Patton or a Horrocks. He was ruthless when necessary, as all successful commanders need to be at times, but I do not think he was ever unfair."

References

Bibliography

External links
Generals of World War II
Biography: Major-General R K Ross, CB DSO MC

|-

1893 births
1951 deaths
Gibraltarians
British Army major generals
Burials in Surrey
British Army generals of World War II
British Army personnel of World War I
British military personnel of the 1936–1939 Arab revolt in Palestine
Companions of the Distinguished Service Order
Companions of the Order of the Bath
Graduates of the Royal Military College, Sandhurst
Recipients of the Legion of Honour
People educated at Cheltenham College
Queen's Royal Regiment officers
Recipients of the Croix de Guerre 1939–1945 (France)
Recipients of the Military Cross